Galkhaite is a rare and chemically complex sulfosalt mineral from a group of natural thioarsenites. It occurs in Carlin-type hydrothermal deposits.

References

Sulfosalt minerals
Caesium minerals
Arsenic minerals
Antimony minerals
Thallium minerals
Cubic minerals
Minerals in space group 217